The 2005–06 NCAA Division I men's ice hockey season began on October 7, 2005 and concluded with the 2006 NCAA Division I men's ice hockey tournament's championship game on April 8, 2006 at the Bradley Center in Milwaukee, Wisconsin. This was the 59th season in which an NCAA ice hockey championship was held and is the 112th year overall where an NCAA school fielded a team.

Pre-season polls

The top 20 from USCHO.com/CSTV and the top 15 from USA Today/USA Hockey Magazine.

Regular season

Season tournaments

Standings

2006 NCAA tournament

Player stats

Scoring leaders
The following players led the league in points at the conclusion of the season.

  
GP = Games played; G = Goals; A = Assists; Pts = Points; PIM = Penalty minutes

Leading goaltenders
The following goaltenders led the league in goals against average at the end of the regular season while playing at least 33% of their team's total minutes.

GP = Games played; Min = Minutes played; W = Wins; L = Losses; OT = Overtime/shootout losses; GA = Goals against; SO = Shutouts; SV% = Save percentage; GAA = Goals against average

Awards

NCAA

Atlantic Hockey

CCHA

CHA

ECAC

Hockey East

WCHA

See also
 2005–06 NCAA Division III men's ice hockey season

References

External links
USCHO.com 
College Hockey Historical Archives
Inside College Hockey
College Hockey Stats.net

 
NCAA